Hunter Sienna McGrady (born May 4, 1993) is an American plus-size model.

Early life
McGrady was born in Los Angeles, to American actor Michael McGrady and model Brynja McGrady. She has an older sister, fellow model Michaela McGrady. The two sisters host a podcast titled Model Citizen. Her younger brother Tynan died in a car accident in 2021.

McGrady married advertising executive Brian Keys in 2019.  They had their first child together, a son, in 2021.

Career 

McGrady started her career as a straight sized model at age 15. At 19, she decided to start plus size modeling because she could not maintain the 00 standard set by her agency. In 2017, she became the largest model (size 16) to appear in a Sports Illustrated Swimsuit Issue. In 2019, she was the first plus-size model on a cover of The Knot.

References

External links

Female models from California
Models from Los Angeles
Plus-size models
People from Tarzana, Los Angeles
1993 births
Living people
21st-century American women